Center Township is a township in Wilson County, Kansas, in the United States.

History
Center Township was named from its position at the geographical center of Wilson County.

References

Townships in Wilson County, Kansas
Townships in Kansas